Friar Bernardo de Brito  (20 August 1569 – 27 February 1617) was a Portuguese monk and historian. He is perhaps best known for having authored the first two volumes of Monarchia Lusytana, his magnum opus.

Biography
Friar Bernardo de Brito was born Baltasar de Brito e Andrade, in the fortified village of Almeida in 1569. His father, Pedro Cardoso de Andrade, was a distinguished army captain who fought in Italy and Flanders who was killed in action during the Siege of Antwerp; his mother was Maria de Brito e Andrade, the sister of Rui de Andrade Freire, alcaide of the Castle of Almeida and fronteiro of Terras de Riba-Côa.

His father wished he joined the military; we was sent abroad to study in Rome and Florence, where he became fluent in Latin, Italian, and French. When he returned to Portugal, he joined the Cistercian Order; he professed his vows in the Alcobaça Monastery, on 23 February 1585, assuming the religious name Bernardo de Brito in honour of Saint Bernard of Clairvaux, reformer of his Order. He obtained a Doctorate in Theology in the University of Coimbra, on 12 April 1606.

He devised a project of a monumental History of Portugal, in eight volumes, from the Creation to his time, which he called Monarchia Lusytana. In 1597, at age 28, he published the first volume, which he dedicated to Philip I of Portugal. As it pleased the monarch (who issued a congratulatory Royal Charter on 3 April 1597), he continued the project and published volume two in 1609. After his death, the unfinished Monarchia Lusytana was continued by other important chroniclers.

He was named chronicler of the Cistercians in 1606 and, in 1614, was made Chief Chronicler of the Kingdom of Portugal. He was several times offered the position of bishop, but always refused.

He died in 1617 and was buried in the Convent of Our Lady of Aguiar, in Castelo Rodrigo, and later, in 1649, his remains were reinterred in the Chapter House of the Alcobaça Monastery.

References

Portuguese chroniclers
Portuguese Roman Catholic priests
University of Coimbra alumni
1569 births
1617 deaths